A processor direct slot (PDS) is a slot incorporated into many older Macintosh models that allowed direct access to the signal pins of a CPU, similar to the functionality of a local bus in PCs. This would result in much higher speeds than having to go through a bus layer, such as NuBus, which typically ran at a slower 10 MHz speed.

Overview 
Typically, if a machine had bus expansion slots it would feature multiple bus expansions slots. However, there was never more than one PDS slot, as rather than providing a sophisticated communication protocol with arbitration between different bits of hardware that might be trying to use the communication channel at the same time, the PDS slot, for the most part, just gave direct access to signal pins on the CPU, making it closer in nature to a local bus.

Thus, PDS slots tended to be CPU-specific, and therefore a card designed for the PDS slot in the Motorola 68030-based Macintosh SE/30, for example, would not work in the Motorola 68040-based Quadra 700.

The one notable exception to this was the PDS design for the original Motorola 68020-based Macintosh LC. This was Apple's first attempt at a "low-cost" Mac, and it was such a success that, when subsequent models replaced the CPU with a 68030, a 68040, and later a PowerPC processor, Apple found methods to keep the PDS slot compatible with the original LC, so that the same expansion cards would continue to work.

History

SE slot (Motorola 68000) 
The SE "System Expansion" slot, introduced in the Macintosh SE in 1987, was the first processor direct slot, using a 96-pin Euro-DIN connector to interface with the Motorola 68000 processor. This slot was also used in the Macintosh Portable.

IIci slot (Motorola 68030) 
The L2 cache slot of the Macintosh IIci, introduced in 1989, was a 32-bit version of a PDS which used a 120-pin Euro-DIN connector to support the Motorola 68030 processor. This slot also appeared in the Macintosh IIsi, IIvi, and IIvx. These allowed for 3rd party companies, such as DayStar Digital, to develop processor upgrades that did not require the removal of the CPU. The Macintosh SE/30 also uses the same PDS configuration, but space inside the compact Mac case is a limiting factor.

IIfx PDS (Motorola 68030) 
The Macintosh IIfx, introduced in 1990, included a PDS that was visually similar to the IIci slot, but differences in pinouts and bus mastering resulted in very limited use.

LC slot (Motorola 68020/68030) 
The LC slot, introduced in 1990, began as a PDS for the Motorola 68020 / 68030 processors in the Macintosh LC / LC II, which used a slower, less expensive 16-bit data bus. The 96-pin Euro-DIN connector in the early 16-bit models look like the SE slot connector, but are incompatible. Latter models added 18 more pins through a notched in-line extension to support a 32-bit data bus, while retaining backwards compatibility with 16-bit cards. This configuration proved to be so popular for Apple's Performa line that later PowerPC-based versions were essentially emulating the 68030 pin signals for the LC slots that they inherited.

Quadra PDS (Motorola 68040) 
The Macintosh Quadra series was introduced in 1991 with a new PDS for the Motorola 68040 processor which was in-line with one of the NuBus slots. The Quadra 605 and Quadra 630 were exceptions which used a 32-bit version of the LC slot. Both allowed for PowerPC upgrades through the "Ready for PowerPC upgrade" program.

Duo Dock connector (Motorola 68030 / NuBus) 
The PowerBook Duo line was introduced in 1992 with a unique 68030-based connector that could allow the subnotebook logic board to communicate with an array of desktop docking systems, some of which could be upgraded with floating-point units. Because of the complexity of larger Duo Docks, NuBus was used to manage parts of the subsystems.

Power Macintosh PDS (PowerPC 601) 
First generation Power Macintosh systems with NuBus architecture, such as the 6100, 7100, and 8100, included a PDS that was used for high-speed AV cards. It was later used by third-party manufacturers to support PowerPC G3 and G4 upgrades.

PowerPC daughtercard slot 
High-end second generation Power Macintosh systems with PCI architecture, such as the 7500 through 9600, had their PowerPC 601 and 604 processors on daughtercards which could be swapped out for PowerPC G3 and G4 upgrades.

PowerPC cache slot 
Mid-range Power Macintosh systems based on PowerPC 603e processors with PCI architecture, such as the 5400, 5500, and 6360 through 6500, featured an L2 cache slot which provided direct access to the CPU. This allowed enterprising third-party manufacturers to build PowerPC G3 upgrades for this slot.

More recent Macs have such high processor speeds that a PDS would not be practical and instead adopted PCIe and Thunderbolt. The last implementation resembling such a slot by Apple is the processor tray connector in the 2009 to 2012 Mac Pros. More recent models have had Intel Xeon processors socketed directly to the logic board.

See also 

 PCI

References 
  Text was copied from Processor direct slot at Apple Wiki, which is released under a Creative Commons Attribution-Share Alike 3.0 (Unported) (CC-BY-SA 3.0) license.

External links
 Pictures of several PDS cards at AppleFritter
 What kind of expansion or upgrade slots does my Mac have? at Mac FAQ
 Notes on PDS variations at Apple Wiki

Macintosh internals
Motherboard expansion slot